The three-part series finale of My Little Pony: Friendship Is Magic consisted of the ninth season's 24th, 25th and 26th episodes as well as the 219th, 220th and 221st overall: the two parts of "The Ending of the End" along with "The Last Problem". Broadcast in prime time on October 12, 2019, on Discovery Family, the finale was 90 minutes long and produced by Allspark Animation. "The Ending of the End" follows Twilight Sparkle, Applejack, Rainbow Dash, Fluttershy, Rarity, Pinkie Pie—known collectively as the "Mane 6"— and dragon friend Spike defending Equestria from their past enemies who are now united. "The Last Problem" is set years after the events of "The Ending of the End" when one of Twilight's students has a friendship problem. To solve it, Twilight recalls the moments she and the Mane 6 spent together.

Plot

The Ending of the End — Part 1 
On the day of Twilight's coronation, Chrysalis, Tirek, and Cozy Glow successfully unlock the power of Grogar's Bewitching Bell, allowing them to use it to make themselves all-powerful. They then betray Grogar and drain him of his magic, revealing him to be Discord in disguise. Discord travels to Canterlot and reveals this to Twilight and her friends while explaining that his actions as Grogar were intended to prepare Twilight for her new role. Despite Discord's good intentions, Twilight, her friends, Princess Celestia and Princess Luna are horrified and furious by his actions and poor planning, so Twilight rallies her friends and allies to prepare for the attack. The villains attack Equestria, with Cozy Glow invading Canterlot Castle and draining Celestia and Luna of their magic, Tirek defeating the Pillars, and Chrysalis ravaging the School of Friendship and capturing Starlight. They regroup at the castle, where they overpower Twilight and her friends and reveal that they have turned the pony races against each other. After her friends insist that she retreat, Twilight teleports away while the others are overwhelmed by the villains.

The Ending of the End — Part 2 
Chrysalis, Tirek, and Cozy Glow imprison the ponies and celebrate their victory, but argue over what to do with the magic they have stolen. Discord enacts a plan to free Starlight so she can release the others. Starlight, Princess Celestia, Princess Luna, Discord and the Pillars fend off the villains while Twilight's friends escape. As they search for Twilight, they find her taking refuge in the Crystal Empire having lost hope and fallen to despair. Suddenly, the Windigos return as a result of the hostility between the pony races and brings forth freezing weather. Encouraged by her friends, Twilight regains her confidence and they return to Canterlot to confront the villains. The villains gain the upper hand until a giant army consisting of all of Equestria and the other kingdoms, united by Twilight's students, appears to assist in the battle. Twilight unites the magic of friendship within her friends, the Young Six and the Pillars to evaporate the Windigos and strip the villains of their power, after which Celestia, Luna and Discord turn them into stone as punishment for their crimes. Celestia expresses that she is proud of Twilight and that she is officially ready to rule Equestria. Twilight postpones her coronation so she and  her friends can spend some quiet time after the battle.

The Last Problem 
In a distant future, Twilight is visited by Luster Dawn, her top student at the School for Gifted Unicorns, who does not understand the importance of friendship, so she tells her a story of how she was once worried about losing her friendships. Flashing back to her coronation day, Twilight prepares to move back to Canterlot with Spike, but worries about drifting apart from her friends. However, her friends seem welcoming of this change and focus more on the final preparations for the ceremony. Twilight expresses her frustration about her friends' contentedness to her moving away and they reveal that they do share her concerns and have been using the preparations to distract themselves. They let out their feelings and cry together, which makes Twilight feel better, knowing that her friends feel the same way. This results in them getting behind on their preparations and almost missing the train to Canterlot. Twilight makes it just in time for her coronation, but the ceremony encounters many problems. After the group share a laugh about the disastrous ceremony, Twilight decides to establish a Council of Friendship so she can maintain her relationships with her friends by convening once every moon, while Celestia and Luna retire to Silver Shoals. Back in the future, Twilight finishes her story and her friends arrive, revealing they have remained friends and are ruling Equestria together as the Council. Twilight explains to Luster that friendships can be hard to maintain, but life is even harder without them. Luster takes the lesson to heart and Twilight sends her to Ponyville, where she begins to make friends and have adventures of her own.

Production 
Supervising director Jim Miller considered it a "real honor to end the show properly and not just have it stop". He wanted to give the characters a "proper send-off", letting the viewers know what the characters were doing in the future and say goodbye. The finale was announced on September 12, 2019.

According to series' director Jim Miller, Discord impersonating Grogar was planned since the beginning of the season, as they wanted Chrysalis, Tirek and Cozy Glow to be the villains since they had more connection to the main characters.

Broadcast 
All three episodes were broadcast in a 90-minute "supersized" timeslot in prime time on October 12, 2019. Prior to their broadcast, Discovery Family aired My Little Pony: Friendship Is Magic — A Decade of Pony, a behind-the-scenes look on the production of the series, featuring interviews from the production crew and cast members, on October 11, 2019. For a week, a "Pony Palooza programming takeover" aired. It began on October 6, 2019, and featured the entire series.

Reception 
Screen Rant ranked "The Last Problem" the second-best season finale and third-best episode according to IMDb.

Potential legacy 
Composer Daniel Ingram hoped for the series to leave a legacy of first-rate children's entertainment as it "set a bar very high" with in many categories, including storytelling, animation and character depth. Many crew members favorably regarded Friendship Is Magic as a once-in-a-lifetime experience.

References

External links 
 
 
 

My Little Pony: Friendship Is Magic episodes
2019 American television episodes
2019 Canadian television episodes
American television series finales